Hagen-Westerbauer station is a through station in the city of Hagen in the German state of North Rhine-Westphalia. The station was opened on 28 May 1983 on a section of the Düsseldorf-Derendorf–Dortmund Süd railway, opened by the Rhenish Railway Company (RhE) between Wuppertal-Wichlinghausen and Hagen RhE station (now Hagen-Eckesey depot) on 15 September 1879. It has two platform tracks and it is classified by Deutsche Bahn as a category 6 station.

The station is served by Rhine-Ruhr S-Bahn line S 8 between Mönchengladbach and Hagen and line S 9 between Recklinghausen and Hagen, both every 60 minutes.

The station is also served by 3 bus routes operated by Hagener Straßenbahn: 514 (every 15-30 minutes), 521 (60) and 532 (60), additionally bus routes 553 and 555 (both every 60 minutes) by Verkehrsgesellschaft Ennepe-Ruhr serve the station.

Notes

Rhine-Ruhr S-Bahn stations
S8 (Rhine-Ruhr S-Bahn)
Buildings and structures in Hagen
Railway stations in Germany opened in 1983
S9 (Rhine-Ruhr S-Bahn)